"Trip the Darkness" is a song by Italian gothic metal band Lacuna Coil, from their sixth studio album Dark Adrenaline (2012). The song was written by Lacuna Coil, while production of the song was handled by Don Gilmore. The song was given its first play on Sirius XM on September 19, 2011, and was released as the first single from the album on 17 October 2011, in Europe and on October 18, 2011, in the United States. "Trip the Darkness" was met with a positive reception from the fans, who praised the return of the band to the original dark sound. An exclusive remix by The Dillinger Escape Plan guitarist Ben Weinman appears on the soundtrack to Underworld: Awakening

Artwork
The dark drawn cover artwork for the single shows a little girl was designed by the bassist of the band Marco Coti Zelati, he did the illustration of the cover for the single which underlines how personal the song is to the band.

Critical reception
"Trip the Darkness" has received a largely positive reception from critics and fans alike upon release. Liz Ramanand from Loudwire gave the song 4 stars out of 5 and called the song a "dark yet very poetic track" whilst praising it for being "almost like an Edgar Alan Poe poem put to music".
Kaj Nocturnal from theblackflag gave the song 10 stars out of 10, saying that "it's unlike anything ever released by the band" and concluded "this is the best work they have ever done".

Chart performance
In the United States, "Trip the Darkness" debuted on the  US Active rock chart in top 40 on November 9, 2011 but peaking at #23 on February 11, 2012. 
On 9 December "Trip the Darkness" won in the "metal/hard rock" category on iTunes Italy.
"Trip The Darkness" is number 2 in Loudwire.com's Top Rock Songs of 2011. It also peaked at #28 on the US Mainstream Rock Tracks chart on February 4, 2012.

Music video

The music video for "Trip the Darkness" was filmed in Milan and was released on December 14, 2011. The directors are Sitcom Soldiers, It was mostly shot in black and white theme. The band wears one outfit of total black and one of total white throughout the video as they play facing off with themselves in a world of alternate reality.

 Director: Ben Thornley and Paul Burrows (Sitcom Soldiers)
 Producer: Sitcomsoldiers
 Director of Photography: Sitcom Soldiers
 Editor: Sitcom Soldiers
 Production Company: Sitcom Soldiers

Charts

Release history

References

Lacuna Coil songs
2011 singles
Century Media Records singles
2011 songs
Songs written by Andrea Ferro
Songs written by Cristina Scabbia
Songs written by Don Gilmore (record producer)